Starfire or Starfires may refer to:

Military
 F-94 Starfire, an American fighter aircraft
 Starfire Optical Range, a United States Air Force research laboratory

Comics
 Starfire (Teen Titans) (1980), alien superheroine and member of the Teen Titans, appearing in DC Comics
 Starfire (1968), the original name of Red Star, a fictional Russian superhero appearing in DC Comics
 Starfire (Star Hunters) (1976), alien swordswoman appearing in DC Comics

Books and games
 Starfire (board wargame), a science fiction strategy game by Starfire Design Studio
 Starfire novel series, in the universe of the wargame, primarily written by Steve White and David Weber
Starfire, a 1960 novel by Robert Buckner and the basis for the film Moon Pilot
 Starfire (Paul Preuss novel), a 1988 science fiction novel by Paul Preuss
 Starfire, a 1999 science fiction novel by Charles Sheffield
 Star Fire, a video arcade game from 1979

Music
 The Starfires, a band from Los Angeles, California
 The Starfires (Cleveland band), a band from Cleveland, Ohio
 Starfire (Jorn album), 2000
 Starfire (Jaga Jazzist album)
 "Starfire", a song from Valley of the Damned, 2003 album by the British power metal band DragonForce

Computing and technology
 Starfire video prototype, an "office of the future" prototype by Sun Microsystems
 Starfire, the code name for the Sun Enterprise 10000 computer by Sun Microsystems
 Starfire, the computer-assisted dispatch system for the New York City Fire Department
 StarFire (navigation system), a wide-area differential GPS developed by John Deere's Precision Farming group

Other
 Nuclear fusion, the source of energy for stars 
 Oldsmobile Starfire, an automobile made by Oldsmobile
 Starfire engine, an adaptation of the Holden straight-six motor
 Starfire Sports, a recreational sports facility in Tukwila, WA
 Star Fire (wrestler), Mexican masked professional wrestler
 Starfire station, a light rail station in Rosemont, CA
 Starfire Software, Inc., a now defunct software company

See also
 Firestar (disambiguation)